Mystroxylon is a genus of flowering plants belonging to the family Celastraceae.

Its native range is Tropical and Southern Africa, and the Western Indian Ocean.

Species
Species:

Mystroxylon aethiopicum 
Mystroxylon comorense

References

Celastraceae
Celastrales genera